Nurgal or Nur Gal is the center of Nurgal district, in the Kunar Province of Afghanistan.

References

External links

Populated places in Kunar Province